This is a list of South Korean television, film, musical, theatre and voice actresses who are active in South Korea. Names are listed as stage name.

A

 Ah Young
 Ahn Eun-jin
 Ahn In-sook
 Ahn Ji-hye
 Ahn Ji-hyun
 Ahn Seo-hyun
 Ahn So-hee
 Ahn So-young
 Ahn Sol-bin 
 Ahn Young-mi
 Ailee
 Anda
 Arin

B

 Bada
 Bae Da-bin
 Bae Doona
 Bae Geu-rin
 Bae Hae-sun
 Bae Jeong-min
 Bae Jong-ok
 Bae Noo-ri
 Bae Seul-ki
 Bae Suzy
 Bae Woo-hee
 Bae Yoon-kyung 
 Baek A-yeon
 Baek Eun-hye
 Baek Hyun-joo
 Baek Ji-won
 Baek Jin-hee
 Baek Ok-dam
 Baek Seo-yi
 Bak Seon-yeong
 Bak Sin-hee
 Bak So-ra
 Bak Yeong-hee
 Ban Hyo-jung
 Ban Se-jung
 Bang Eun-hee
 Bang Eun-jin
 Bang Min-ah
 Bibi
 BoA
 Bona
 Byun Jung-soo

C

 Cha Chung-hwa
 Cha Hwa-yeon
 Cha Joo-young
 Cha Jung-won
 Cha Mi-kyung
 Cha Min-ji
 Cha Soo-yeon
 Cha Ye-ryun
 Chae Bin
 Chae Eui-jin
 Chae Jung-an
 Chae Min-seo
 Chae Rim
 Chae Seo-jin
 Chae Shi-ra
 Chae Soo-bin
 Chae Yeon
 Chae Young-in
 Chang Mi-hee
 Cheetah
 Margaret Cho
 Cho Mi-yeon
 Cho Seung-hee
 Cho Soo-hyang
 Cho Yeo-jeong
 Cho Yi-hyun
 Choi Bae-young
 Choi Eun-hee
 Choi Han-bit
 Choi Hee-seo
 Choi Hwa-jung
 Choi Hyo-eun 
 Choi Ja-hye
 Choi Ji-na
 Choi Ji-woo
 Choi Jin-sil
 Choi Jung-won
 Choi Jung-won
 Choi Jung-yoon
 Choi Kang-hee
 Choi Myung-bin
 Choi Myung-gil
 Choi Ran
 Choi Ri
 Choi Seong-woo
 Choi Song-hyun
 Choi Soo-eun
 Choi Soo-in
 Choi Soo-jin
 Choi Soo-young
 Choi Su-rin 
 Choi Sung-eun
 Choi Ye-bin
 Choi Yeo-jin
 Choi Yoo-jung
 Choi Yoo-jung
 Choi Yoon-so
 Choi Yoon-young
 Choi Yu-hwa
 Choi Yu-jin
 Choo Ja-hyun
 Choo Soo-hyun
 Chu Sang-mi
 Chu Ye-jin
 Chun Woo-hee
 Chung Misook

D

 Dana
 Dawon
 Do Ji-won
 Do Kum-bong

E

 Eom Hyeon-jeong
 Esom
 Eugene
 Eunha
 Exy
 Eyedi

F 

 Yuko Fueki

G

 Ga Deuk-hee
 Gain
 Geum Bo-ra
 Gil Eun-hye
 Gil Hae-yeon
 Go Ah-sung
 Go Ara
 Go Bo-gyeol 
 Go Doo-shim
 Go Eun-ah
 Go Hyun-jung
 Go Joon-hee
 Go Min-si
 Go Soo-hee
 Go Soo-jung 
 Go Won-hee
 Go Woo-ri
 Go Youn-jung 
 Gong Hyo-jin
 Gong Hyun-joo
 Gong Min-jeung
 Gong Seung-yeon
 Goo Hara
 Goo Jae-yee

H

 Ha Hee-ra
 Ha Jae-sook
 Ha Ji-won
 Ha Ji-young 
 Ha Joo-hee
 Ha Seung-ri
 Ha Yeo-jin
 Ha Yeon-joo
 Ha Yeon-soo
 Ha Yoo-mi
 Hahm Eun-jung
 Han Bo-bae
 Han Bo-reum
 Han Chae-ah
 Han Chae-young
 Han Da-min
 Han Eun-jung
 Han Ga-in
 Han Go-eun
 Han Groo
 Han Hye-jin
 Han Hye-ri
 Han Hye-rin
 Han Hye-sook
 Han Hyo-joo
 Han Ji-an
 Han Ji-eun
 Han Ji-hye
 Han Ji-hyun
 Han Ji-min
 Han Ji-wan
 Han Kyeong-hwa
 Han Na-na 
 Han Seung-yeon
 Han So-eun
 Han So-hee
 Han Soo-yeon
 Han Sun-hwa
 Han Sung-yun 
 Han Ye-ri
 Han Ye-seul
 Han Yeo-reum
 Yuny Han
 Hana
 Hani
 Harisu
 Heo Ga-yoon
 Heo Jung-eun
 Heo Yi-jae
 Heo Yool
 Heo Young-ji
 Heyne
 Hong Ah-reum
 Hong Eun-hee
 Hong Hwa-ri
 Hong In-young
 Hong Ji-yoon
 Hong Jin-kyung
 Hong Jin-young
 Hong Ri-na
 Hong Seung-hee
 Hong Soo-ah
 Hong Soo-hyun
 Hong Yeo-jin
 Horan
 Hwang Bo-ra
 Hwang Bo-reum-byeol
 Hwang Geum-hee
 Hwang Hyun-hee
 Hwang In-young
 Hwang Jung-eum
 Hwang Seok-jeong
 Hwang Seung-eon
 Hwang Shin-hye
 Hwang Soo-jung
 Hwang Sun-hee
 Hwang Woo-seul-hye
 Hwang Young-hee
 Hwangbo
 Hyolyn
 Hyomin
 Hyun Jyu-ni
 Hyun Young

I

 Im Ji-eun
 Im Jung-eun
 Im Se-mi
 Im Soo-hyang
 Im Soo-jung
 Im Ye-jin
 Im Yoon-ah
 Irene
 IU
 Ivy

J

 J-Min
 Jang Do-yeon
 Jang Hee-jin
 Jang Hee-ryung
 Jang Hye-jin 
 Jang Ja-yeon
 Jang Jin-young
 Jang Jung-hee
 Jang Mi-inae
 Jang Na-ra
 Jang Seo-hee
 Jang Shin-young
 Jang So-yeon
 Jang Yoon-jeong 
 Jang Yoon-ju
 Jang Young-nam
 Jang Young-ran
 Jeon Boram
 Jeon Do-yeon
 Jeon Hye-bin
 Jeon Hye-jin
 Jeon Hye-jin
 Jeon In-hwa
 Jeon Ji-yoon
 Jeon Jong-seo
 Jeon Mi-do 
 Jeon Mi-seon
 Jeon Min-seo
 Jeon Ok
 Jeon So-mi
 Jeon So-min
 Jeon So-nee 
 Jeon Soo-jin
 Jeon Soo-kyeong
 Jeon Ye-seo
 Jeon Yeo-been
 Jeong Da-bin
 Jeong Da-hye
 Jeong Eun-ji
 Jeong Ga-eun
 Jeong Ha-dam
 Jeong Nam
 Jeong Yu-mi
 Jeong Yun-hui
 Ji Ha-yoon
 Ji Joo-yeon
 Ji Woo
 Ji Yi-soo 
 Jin Hee-kyung
 Jin Ji-hee
 Jin Ki-joo
 Jin Kyung
 Jin Se-yeon
 Jin Seo-yeon
 Jin So-yeon 
 Jin Ye-ju
 Jin Ye-sol
 Jisoo
 Jiyul
 Jo An
 Jo Bo-ah
 Jo Eun-byul
 Jo Eun-ji
 Jo Eun-sook
 Jo Hye-joo
 Jo Hye-ryun
 Jo Hyeon-jeong
 Jo Jung-eun
 Jo Mi-ryeong
 Jo Mi-ryung
 Jo Min-su
 Jo Soo-min
 Jo Woo-ri
 Jo Yi-jin
 Jo Yoon-hee
 Johyun 
 Joo
 Joo Da-young
 Joo Hae-eun 
 Joo Ye-rim
 Joy
 Ju Jeung-ryu
 Jun Hyo-seong
 Jun Ji-hyun
 Jung Ae-ri
 Jung Chae-yeon
 Jung Da-bin
 Jung Da-eun
 Jung Eun-chae
 Jung Ha-na
 HoYeon Jung
 Jung Hye-in
 Jung Hye-sun
 Jung Hye-sung
 Jung Hye-young
 Jung In-seo 
 Jung In-sun
 Jung Jae-eun 
 Jessica Jung
 Jung Ji-so 
 Jung Ji-yoon
 Krystal Jung
 Jung Min-ah
 Nicole Jung
 Jung Ryeo-won
 Jung So-min
 Jung Soo-young 
 Sora Jung
 Jung Ye-ji 
 Jung Yeon-joo 
 Jung Yoo-jin
 Jung Yu-mi

K

 Kahi
 Kal So-won
 Kan Mi-youn
 Kang Boo-ja
 Kang Byul
 Kang Da-hyun
 Kang Eun-bi
 Kang Eun-jin
 Kang Han-na
 Kang Hye-jung
 Kang Ji-young
 Kang Mal-geum
 Kang Mi-na
 Kang Min-ah
 Kang Min-kyung
 Kang Rae-yeon 
 Kang Se-jung
 Kang Seung-hyun
 Kang So-ra
 Kang Soo-jin
 Kang Soo-yeon
 Kang Sung-yeon
 Kang Ye-seo
 Kang Ye-won
 Kei
 Keum Sae-rok
 Ki Hui-hyeon
 Kim Ah-joong
 Kim Bo-kyung
 Kim Bo-mi
 Kim Bo-ra
 Kim Bo-yeon
 Kim Chae-yeon
 Kim Chanmi
 Claudia Kim
 Kim Da-mi
 Kim Da-som
 Kim Do-ah
 Kim Do-yeon
 Kim E-Z
 Kim Eul-dong
 Kim Ga-eun
 Kim Ga-yeon
 Kim Ga-young
 Kim Go-eun
 Kim Gook-hee 
 Kim Gyu-ri
 Kim Gyu-ri
 Kim Ha-eun
 Kim Ha-neul
 Kim Ha-yeon
 Kim Hae-sook
 Kim Hee-ae
 Kim Hee-jung
 Kim Hee-jung
 Kim Hee-sun
 Kim Ho-jung
 Kim Hwan-hee
 Kim Hyang-gi
 Kim Hye-eun
 Kim Hye-in
 Kim Hye-ja
 Kim Hye-jin
 Kim Hye-jun
 Kim Hye-ok
 Kim Hye-ri
 Kim Hye-soo
 Kim Hye-sun
 Kim Hye-yoon
 Kim Hyo-jin
 Kim Hyun 
 Kim Hyun-joo
 Kim Hyun-soo
 Kim Hyun-sook
 Kim In-seo
 Kim Isak
 Kim Ja-ok
 Kim Jae-hwa
 Kim Jae-kyung
 Kim Ji-eun
 Kim Ji-ho
 Kim Ji-hyun
 Kim Ji-hyun
 Kim Ji-in
 Kim Ji-mee
 Kim Ji-min
 Kim Ji-min
 Kim Ji-soo
 Kim Ji-sung
 Kim Ji-won
 Kim Ji-woo
 Kim Ji-yeong
 Kim Ji-young
 Kim Ji-young
 Kim Ji-young
 Kim Jin-kyung
 Kim Jin-yi 
 Kim Joo-ri
 Kim Joo-ryoung
 Kim Ju-hyeon
 Kim Jung-ah
 Kim Jung-eun
 Kim Jung-hwa
 Kim Jung-nan
 Kim Jung-young
 Kim Kkot-bi
 Kim Mi-kyung
 Kim Mi-soo 
 Kim Mi-sook
 Kim Min-ah
 Kim Min-hee
 Kim Min-hee
 Kim Min-ji
 Kim Min-ju 
 Kim Min-jung
 Kim Min-seo
 Kim Min-seo (2009)
 Kim Min-young
 Kim Na-woon
 Kim Na-young
 Kim Nam-joo
 Kim Nam-joo
 Kim Ok-vin
 Kim Sa-rang
 Kim Sae-byuk
 Kim Sae-ron
 Kim Se-ah 
 Kim Se-jeong
 Kim Seo-hyung
 Kim Seo-yeong
 Kim Seol-hyun
 Kim Seul-gi
 Kim Shin-young
 Kim Si-eun 
 Kim So-eun
 Kim So-hee
 Kim So-hee 
 Kim So-hye
 Kim So-hyun
 Kim So-hyun
 Kim So-jin
 Kim So-yeon
 Kim Soo-jin
 Kim Soo-mi
 Kim Sook
 Soy Kim 
 Kim Su-an
 Kim Su-jung
 Kim Sun-a
 Kim Sun-young
 Kim Sun-young
 Kim Sung-eun
 Kim Sung-eun
 Kim Sung-kyung
 Kim Sung-ryung
 Kim Tae-hee
 Kim Tae-ri
 Kim Tae-yeon
 Kim Won-hee
 Kim Ye-eun 
 Kim Ye-ryeong
 Kim Ye-won
 Kim Ye-won
 Kim Ye-won
 Kim Yeo-jin
 Kim Yi-kyung 
 Kim Yong-rim
 Kim Yoo-bin
 Kim Yoo-jung
 Kim Yoo-mi
 Kim Yoo-ri
 Kim Yoon-ah 
 Kim Yoon-hye
 Kim Yoon-ji
 Kim Yoon-seo
 Kim Young-ae
 Kim Young-hee
 Kim Young-ok
 Kim Young-ran
 Kim Young-sun
 Kim Yu-bin
 Kim Yu-mi
 Yunjin Kim
 Kisum 
 Ko Eun-ah
 Ko Eun-mi
 Ko Joo-yeon
 Ko So-young
 Ko Sung-hee
 Koo Hye-sun
 Kwak Hyun-hwa
 Kwak Ji-min
 Kwak Sun-young
 Kwon Eun-bin
 Kwon Eun-soo
 Kwon Hee-deok
 Kwon Mina
 Kwon Nara
 Kwon Ri-se
 Kwon So-hyun
 Kwon So-hyun
 Kwon Yu-ri
 Kyeon Mi-ri
 Kyung Soo-jin

L

 Lee Ae-jung
 Lee Ah-hyun
 Lee Ah-jin
 Lee Ahyumi
 Lee Bit-na
 Lee Bo-hee
 Lee Bo-ram
 Lee Bo-young
 Lee Bong-ryun 
 Lee Chae-kyung
 Lee Chae-mi
 Lee Chae-young
 Lee Cho-hee
 Lee Chung-ah
 Lee Chung-mi 
 Clara Lee
 Lee Da-hae
 Lee Da-hee
 Lee Da-in
 Lee Da-in
 Lee El
 Lee Elijah
 Lee Eun-ju
 Lee Eun-sung
 Lee Eun-woo
 Lee Eung-kyung
 Lee Ga-hyun
 Lee Ga-ryeong
 Lee Go-eun
 Lee Guk-joo
 Lee Ha-na
 Lee Hae-in
 Lee Hae-in
 Lee Hae-ri
 Lee Hanee
 Lee Hang-na
 Lee Hee-jin
 Lee Ho-jung
 Lee Hwa-kyum
 Lee Hwa-si
 Lee Hwi-hyang
 Lee Hye-in
 Lee Hye-ri
 Lee Hye-sook
 Lee Hye-young
 Lee Hye-young
 Lee Hyori
 Lee Hyun-joo 
 Lee Il-hwa
 Lee In-hye
 Lee Jae-in
 Jasmine Bacurnay Lee
 Lee Ji-ah
 Lee Ji-eun
 Lee Ji-ha 
 Lee Ji-hye
 Lee Ji-hyun
 Lee Jin
 Lee Jin-ah
 Lee Joo-bin 
 Lee Joo-myung
 Lee Joo-woo
 Lee Joo-yeon
 Lee Joo-young
 Lee Joo-young
 Lee Joon-ha
 Lee Ju-eun 
 Lee Jung-eun
 Lee Jung-hyun
 Lee Kan-hee
 Lee Kyoung-mi
 Lee Mi-do
 Lee Mi-sook
 Lee Mi-yeon
 Lee Mi-young
 Lee Min-ji
 Lee Min-ji 
 Lee Min-jung
 Lee Min-young
 Lee Na-eun
 Lee Na-young
 Lee Nan-young
 Lee Re
 Lee Sa-bi
 Lee Sang-hee
 Lee Se-eun
 Lee Se-hee
 Lee Se-mi
 Lee Se-na
 Lee Se-young
 Lee Se-young
 Lee Seo-el 
 Lee Seol
 Lee Seol
 Lee Seul-bi
 Lee Seung-yeon
 Lee Seung-yeon
 Lee Si-a
 Lee Si-won
 Lee Si-woo
 Lee Si-yeon
 Lee Si-young
 Lee So-yeon
 Lee Soo-kyung
 Lee Soo-kyung
 Lee Soo-mi
 Lee Soo-min
 Lee Soo-min
 Lee Soo-young
 Stephanie Lee
 Lee Su-hyun
 Lee Su-ji
 Lee Sun-bin
 Lee Sung-kyung
 Lee Tae-im
 Lee Tae-ran
 Tomiko Lee
 Lee Ye-hyun 
 Lee Yeon-doo
 Lee Yeon-hee
 Lee Yo-won
 Lee Yoo-jin
 Lee Yoo-mi
 Lee Yoo-young
 Lee Yong-shin
 Lee Yoon-ji
 Lee Yoon-mi
 Lee Young-ae
 Lee Young-ah
 Lee Young-eun
 Lee Young-ja
 Lee Young-jin
 Lee Young-yoo
 Lee Yu-bi
 Lee Yu-ri
 Lee Yul-eum
 Lim Eun-kyung
 Lim Hwa-young
 Lim Ji-yeon
 Lim Ju-eun
 Lim Kim
 Lim Na-young 
 Lina
 Lisa
 Luna

M

 Maya
 MayBee
 Mijoo
 Min
 Min Do-hee
 Min Hyo-rin
 Min Ji-hyun
 Min Young-won
 Moon Chae-won
 Moon Ga-young
 Moon Geun-young
 Moon Hee
 Moon Hee-kyung
 Moon Jeong-hee
 Moon Ji-in
 Moon Nam-sook
 Moon So-ri
 Moon Ye-won 
 Moonbyul
 Mun Seon-hui
 Myung Ji-yun
 Myung Se-bin

N

 Na Hae-ryung
 Na Hye-mi
 Na Hyun-hee
 Na Moon-hee
 Na Yoon-sun
 Na Young-hee
 Nam Bo-ra
 Nam Gi-ae
 Nam Gyu-ri
 Nam Jeong-im
 Nam Ji-hyun
 Nam Sang-ji
 Nam Sang-mi
 Nana
 Nancy 
 Narsha
 NC.A
 Noh Sa-yeon

O

 Ock Joo-hyun
 Oh Ah-rin 
 Oh Ah-yeon 
 Oh Ha-young
 Oh Hye-won 
 Oh Hyun-kyung
 Oh In-hye 
 Oh Ji-eun
 Oh Joo-yeon
 Oh Na-ra
 Oh Seung-ah 
 Oh Yeon-ah
 Oh Yeon-seo
 Oh Yeon-soo
 Oh Yoon-ah
 Oh Yoon-hong
 Ok Ye-rin
 Ok So-ri
 Joy Osmanski

P

 Park Ah-in
 Park Bo-young
 Park Cho-a
 Park Cho-rong
 Park Eun-bin
 Park Eun-hye
 Park Eun-ji
 Grace Park
 Greena Park
 Park Gyeong-ree 
 Park Gyu-ri
 Park Gyu-young 
 Park Ha-na
 Park Ha-sun
 Park Hae-mi
 Park Han-byul
 Park Han-sol
 Park Hee-jin 
 Park Hee-jung
 Park Hee-von
 Park Hwan-hee
 Park Hye-su
 Park Hyo-joo
 Park In-young 
 Park Jeong-hwa
 Park Ji-a
 Park Ji-hoo 
 Park Ji-hyun 
 Park Ji-soo
 Park Ji-yeon
 Park Ji-yoon
 Park Ji-young
 Park Jin-hee
 Park Jin-joo
 Park Joo-mi
 Park Joon-geum
 Park Ju-hyun 
 Park Jung-ah
 Park Jung-soo
 Park Jung-yeon 
 Park Kyung-hye
 Park Kyung-lim
 Park Mi-sun
 Park Min-ha
 Park Min-ji
 Park Min-young
 Park Na-rae
 Sandara Park
 Park Sa-rang
 Park Se-wan
 Park Se-young
 Park Seo-yeon
 Park Shin-hye
 Park Si-eun
 Park Si-eun
 Park Si-yeon
 Park So-dam
 Park So-hyun
 Park So-jin
 Park So-yeon
 Park So-yi
 Park Sol-mi
 Park Soo-ah
 Park Soo-jin
 Park Subin 
 Park Sun-young
 Park Won-sook
 Park Ye-eun
 Park Ye-jin
 Park Yoo-na
 Park Young-rin
 Pyo Ye-jin

Q

 Qri

R

 Ra Mi-ran
 Rhee Ji-yeong
 Roh Jeong-eui
 Ryu Hwa-young
 Ryu Hye-rin 
 Ryu Hye-young
 Ryu Hyo-young
 Ryu Hyun-kyung
 Ryu Se-ra
 Ryu Su-jeong 
 Ryu Won

S

 Seo Cho-won 
 Seo Eun-ah
 Seo Eun-soo
 Seo Hye-won
 Seo Hyo-rim
 Seo Hyun-jin
 Seo In-young
 Seo Jeong-yeon
 Seo Ji-hee
 Seo Ji-hye
 Seo Ji-young
 Seo Min-jung
 Seo Seung-ah
 Seo Shin-ae
 Seo Woo
 Seo Ye-hwa
 Seo Yea-ji
 Seo Young
 Seo Young-hee
 Seo Yu-na
 Seo Yu-ri
 Seohyun
 Seol In-ah
 Seulgi
 Seung Hyo-bin
 Seunghee
 Shannon
 Shim Dal-gi
 Shim Eun-ha
 Shim Eun-jin
 Shim Eun-kyung
 Shim Eun-woo 
 Shim Hye-jin
 Shim Yi-young
 Shin Ae
 Shin Ae-ra
 Shin Bo-ra
 Shin Da-eun
 Shin Do-hyun 
 Shin Dong-mi
 Shin Eun-jung
 Shin Eun-kyung
 Shin Eun-soo
 Shin Ha-young 
 Shin Hye-jeong
 Shin Hye-sun
 Shin Hyun-been
 Shin Ji
 Shin Ji-hoon
 Shin Ji-soo
 Shin Min-a
 Shin Rin-ah
 Shin Se-hwi 
 Shin Se-kyung
 Shin So-yul
 Shin Soo-yeon 
 Shin Ye-eun
 Shin Yi
 Shin Youngsook
 Shoo
 SinB
 So Hee-jung
 So Joo-yeon 
 So Yi-hyun
 So Yoo-jin
 Son Dam-bi
 Son Eun-seo
 Son Ji-hyun
 Son Na-eun
 Son Se-bin
 Son Seong-yoon
 Son Tae-young
 Son Ye-jin
 Son Yeo-eun
 Song Do-yeong
 Song Ha-yoon
 Song Hye-kyo
 Song Ji-eun
 Song Ji-hyo
 Song Mi-jin
 Song Ok-sook
 Song Seon-mi
 Song Sin-do
 Song Yoo-hyun
 Song Yoo-jung
 Song Yoon-ah
 Soo Ae
 Sori 
 Stephanie
 Suh Jung
 Sulli
 Sunday
 Sunny
 Sung Hyun-ah
 Sung Yu-ri
 Sunwoo Eun-sook
 Sunwoo Sun
 Sunwoo Yong-nyeo

T

 Tae Hyun-sil
 Taeyeon

U

 U;Nee
 Uee
 Uhm Hyun-kyung
 Uhm Ji-won
 Uhm Jung-hwa
 Um Aing-ran

V

 Viki

W

 Wang Bit-na
 Wang Ji-hye
 Wang Ji-won
 Wendy
 Won Ji-an
 Won Jin-ah
 Won Mi-kyung
 Woo Hee-jin
 Woo Hye-rim
 Woo Seung-yeon

X

 Xiyeon

Y

 Yang Geum-seok
 Yang Hee-kyung
 Yang Hye-ji
 Yang Jin-sung
 Yang Jung-a
 Yang Mi-kyung
 Yang Yoo-jin
 Ye Ji-won
 Yebin
 Yeo Min-jeong
 Yeo Woon-kay
 Yeojin Jeon
 Yeom Hye-ran
 Yeon Min-ji
 Yeonwoo
 Yeri 
 Yerin
 Yoo Ara
 Yoo Chae-yeong
 Yoo Da-in
 Yoo Eun-mi
 Yoo Ha-na
 Yoo Hae-jung
 Yoo Ho-jeong
 Yoo Hye-ri 
 Yoo In-na
 Yoo In-young
 Yoo Se-rye
 Yoo So-young
 Yoo Sun
 Yoo Ye-bin
 Yoo Yeon-mi
 YooA
 Yoon A-jung
 Yoon Bo-mi
 Yoon Bo-ra
 Yoon Bok-hee
 Yoon Bok-in
 Yoon Da-gyeong
 Yoon Eun-hye
 Yoon Hae-young
 Jean Yoon
 Yoon Jeong-hee
 Yoon Ji-hye
 Yoon Ji-min
 Yoon Jin-seo
 Yoon Jin-yi
 Yoon Joo
 Yoon Joo-hee
 Yoon Jung-hee
 Yoon Mi-ra
 Yoon Mi-rim
 Yoon Sa-bong 
 Yoon Se-ah
 Yoon Seo
 Yoon Seung-ah
 Yoon So-hee
 Yoon So-yi
 Yoon Son-ha
 Yoon Yoo-sun
 Yoon Young-ah
 Youn Yuh-jung
 Youn-a
 Tiffany Young
 Younha
 Yozoh
 Yu Ji-in
 Yum Jung-ah
 Yura

Z

 Z.Hera

See also

 Korean drama
 Contemporary culture of South Korea
 List of people of Korean descent

Actresses
Actresses
Lists of South Korean actors
Lists of South Korean women